Edward J. Hart (May 26, 1887 — November 28, 1956) was an American football tackle. He was a consensus All-American in 1911. Hart played high school football at Phillips Exeter Academy. In his last game at Phillips Exeter he suffered a dislocation in his neck when he ran into a goalpost. This resulted in Hart having to wear a neckbrace for his first three years of college football at Princeton University. He removed the brace in 1911. He was the captain of the Princeton Tigers football team in 1910 and 1911. Hart was a captain in the United States Army in World War I and major in the United States Marines in World War II.  He was elected to the College Football Hall of Fame in 1954.

References

1887 births
1956 deaths
People from Exeter, New Hampshire
American football tackles
Princeton Tigers football players
College Football Hall of Fame inductees
All-American college football players
United States Marine Corps officers
United States Army officers
Players of American football from New Hampshire
United States Army personnel of World War I
United States Marine Corps personnel of World War II
Sportspeople from Rockingham County, New Hampshire